H Train could refer to:
The H (New York City Subway service), the former designation for the Rockaway Shuttle
High Speed Train